Charles Malcolm Dodge (b. Ames, Iowa, June 5, 1942) is an American composer best known for his electronic music, specifically his computer music. He is a former student of Darius Milhaud and Gunther Schuller.

Education and teaching career
Dodge received his undergraduate education (BA) at the University of Iowa in 1964, and earned his MA (1966) and doctorate (DMA) (1970) at Columbia University. He also studied at Princeton University in 1969-70. While at Columbia, Dodge was very active at the Columbia-Princeton Electronic Music Center. Dodge was one of the leading innovators in the emerging field of computer music composition (as opposed to analog electronic composition, the norm in the field through the 1970s).

From 1970 to 1977 he taught at Columbia and subsequently founded the Brooklyn College Center for Computer Music (BC-CCM) (1977) at Brooklyn College of the City University of New York where he was Professor of Music. He also taught at the City University Graduate Center.  During Dodge’s years as Professor of Composition and Director of the BC-CCM, Dodge not only had the BC-CCM designated as an official Center within Brooklyn College in 1978 but more importantly brought it to a world-class standing in the field of computer music.

In the early 1990s Dodge left Brooklyn College for Dartmouth College.  In May 2009 he retired from the position of Visiting Professor at Dartmouth College, a post he held for 18 years.  In addition to his work as a composer, Dodge is noted for co-authoring the highly praised book Computer Music: Synthesis, Composition, and Performance,  

Best known in recent years as the owner, with his wife Katharine, of the Putney Mountain Winery in Putney, Vermont. The company has experienced growth every year since its founding in 1998.

Music
Dodge created many works in the field of computer music, including Earth’s Magnetic Field (1970), which mapped magnetic field data to musical sounds, Speech Songs, a 1974 work that used analysis and resynthesis of human voices, The Waves (voice and computer music), Profile, and Any Resemblance is Purely Coincidental (1978), which combines live piano performance with a digitally-manipulated recording of Enrico Caruso singing the aria "Vesti la giubba."

Discography
Columbia-Princeton Electronic Music Center 1961-1973, New World Records, 1998.
"Earth's Magnetic Field" (originally released in a longer version on Nonesuch/Elektra 71250 in 1970)
Computer Music, Nonesuch/Elektra 71245, 1970
"Changes"
Synthesized Voices, CRI SD 348, 1976.
"In Celebration"
"Speech Songs"
"The Story Of Our Lives"
Electro Acoustic Music 1, Neuma, 1990.
"Profile"
Any Resemblance is Purely Coincidental, New Albion, 1994.
"Any Resemblance is Purely Coincidental"
"Speech Songs"
"The Waves"
"Viola Elegy'"
The Composer in the Computer Age III, CDCM Series Volume 18, Centaur, 2006?.
"In Celebration"

References

External links
Charles Dodge page at Dartmouth College Department of Music site
 in the Music Division of The New York Public Library for the Performing Arts.
 Brooklyn College Center for Computer Music

Listening
Epitonic.com: Charles Dodge two works from Any Resemblance is Purely Coincidental
Art of the States: Charles Dodge Any Resemblance is Purely Coincidental (1980)
Charles Dodge interview from American Mavericks site
Charles Dodge interviewed by Charles Amirkhanian, 1975

1942 births
20th-century classical composers
21st-century classical composers
American male classical composers
American classical composers
Brooklyn College faculty
Dartmouth College faculty
Living people
Pupils of Darius Milhaud
Nonesuch Records artists
Pupils of Gunther Schuller
21st-century American composers
20th-century American composers